The Battle of Podhajce (October 6–16, 1667) was fought in the town of Podhajce in the Polish–Lithuanian Commonwealth (nowadays Pidhaitsi, western Ukraine), and the area surrounding it as part of the Polish-Tartar War and the Great Turkish War. The army of the Polish–Lithuanian Commonwealth under John III Sobieski, totaling around 9,000 men, defeated Tatar and Cossack forces under Petro Doroshenko and Adil Giray, which totaled around 35,000 men.

Prelude to battle 
On January 31, 1667 the Polish–Lithuanian Commonwealth and the Tsardom of Russia signed the Treaty of Andrusovo. Russia gained the control of Left-bank Ukraine, while the commonwealth maintained the rule of Right-bank Ukraine, which would be defended by Polish-Lithuanian and Russian forces. The end of the war gave time to commonwealth armies for reinforcement.  In the same period Petro Doroshenko, Hetman of Right-bank Ukraine, in order to establish his rule in Right-bank Ukraine, signed a treaty with Sultan Mehmed IV that recognized the Cossack Hetmanate as a vassal of the Ottoman Empire.

To further increase his military strength Doroshenko allied with Adil Giray, the khan of the Crimean Khanate. After gathering 15,000 Cossacks, about 18,000 Tatars, and 3,000 Janissaries sent by the Ottoman Empire to support the Cossacks, Doroshenko attacked the area of Podhajce in western Ukraine. Polish-Lithuanian forces under John III Sobieski, made up mostly of armed villagers, orthodox Galician Ruthenians who remained loyal to Polish kings since the beginning of Chmelnitsky's uprising, encamped themselves on the southern part of Podhajce in order to gain a strategic advantage against the army of Doroshenko. On October 4, 1667 the Cossack-Tatar forces, supported by Janissaries arrived in Podhajce.

Battle 
On October 6, 1667 Tatar forces under Adil Giray attacked the Polish-Lithuanian army. The Polish-Lithuanian infantry, supported by Polish multiple guns, defeated the Tatars and counterattacked. On the following days Cossack, Tatar and Janissary troops unsuccessfully tried to circumvent the right wing of the Polish-Lithuanian army, and flank attack the left wing of the troops of the Commonwealth.

Sobieski sent forces on the left wing of the army, and outnumbered the Cossack-Tatar forces, which were defeated. After the failure of consecutive attacked, Doroshenko unsuccessfully besieged the town of Podhajce, which was defended by Jan Sobieski. In the middle of October, 1667 Sobieski and Doroshenko signed an armistice and the Cossack-Tatar army retreated from Podhajce.

Aftermath 
After defeating Doroshenko in Podhajce, John III Sobieski was promoted to commander-in-chief of the Polish-Lithuanian army and Grand Crown Hetman, the highest military rank in the Polish–Lithuanian Commonwealth.

References 

Battles of the Great Turkish War
Cossack Hetmanate
Battles involving the Polish–Lithuanian Commonwealth
Conflicts in 1667
Battles involving the Crimean Khanate
1667 in Europe
1667 in the Polish–Lithuanian Commonwealth
17th century in the Zaporozhian Host